Pierre Gérin (1913–1982) was a French film producer.

Selected filmography
 Not So Stupid (1946)
 The Last Vacation (1948)
 Impeccable Henri (1948)
 Thirst of Men (1950)
 The Man Who Returns from Afar (1950)
 The Night Is My Kingdom (1951)
 The Love of a Woman (1953)
 Open Letter (1953)
 Adventures of the Barber of Seville (1954)
 Three Sailors (1957)

References

Bibliography
 Michel Marie. The French New Wave: An Artistic School. John Wiley & Sons, 2008.

External links

1913 births
1982 deaths
French film producers
Film people from Paris